Bastašić is a surname. People with that name include:

 Jozafat Bastašić (1740-1793), Greek Catholic hierarch
 Lana Bastašić (born 1986), Bosnian and Serbian writer, novelist and translator

See also